Stanislaus Okurut (? – 5 April 2014) was a Ugandan politician. He served as the Minister of Sports from 1986 to 1986, as well as separate tenures as the Minister of Labour and the Minister of Transport.

Okurut was married to Mary Karooro., an MP for the Bushenyi District Women's Constituency, has served as the Minister of Gender, Labour and Social Development since 2012.

Okurut died from a heart attack at his home in Ntinda, Kampala, Uganda, on 5 April 2014, at the age of 84. He had undergone minor surgery earlier in the week.

References

2014 deaths
Government ministers of Uganda
Members of the Parliament of Uganda
People from Kampala District
Year of birth missing